"Got the Feelin'" is a song by English boy band Five. It was released 8 June 1998 as the third single from their debut studio album Five (1998). It was written by Richard Stannard, Julian Gallagher, Jason "J" Brown, Sean Conlon, and Abs Breen and produced by Denniz Pop and Jake Schulze. The song became a hit, peaking at  3 in the United Kingdom, No. 2 in New Zealand, and No. 4 in Ireland. It was also successful in several mainland European countries.

Chart performance
"Got the Feelin'" reached a peak position of No. 3 on the UK Singles Chart, becoming the band's third top-ten single and their highest-charting single until the album's next single "Everybody Get Up" reached No. 2. "Got the Feelin'" debuted at No. 35 on the Australian ARIA Singles Chart and eventually peaked at No. 6, becoming the band's third consecutive top-ten hit. It was also a success across Europe and Oceania, having reached the top five in Flanders, Ireland, the Netherlands, and New Zealand, the top ten in Finland and Greece, and the top twenty in Sweden. The song received a Gold sales status certification in the UK for the shipment of 400,000 copies.

Music video
The video was shot in just four takes in a private swimming pool down Chatsworth Avenue. English-born Australian music director Phil Thompson choreographed and videoed the shoot.

Track listings

UK CD1
 "Got the Feelin'" (radio edit)
 "Coming Back for More"
 "Got the Feelin'" (extended)
 "Got the Feelin'" (video)

UK CD2 
 "Got the Feelin'" (radio edit)
 "Got the Feelin'" (instrumental)
 "When the Lights Go Out" (US remix)
 Exclusive interview

UK cassette single and European CD single
 "Got the Feelin'" (radio edit) – 3:28
 "Got the Feelin'" (extended) – 5:20

Australian CD single
 "Got the Feelin'" (radio edit)
 "Got the Feelin'" (instrumental)
 "Got the Feelin'" (extended)
 "Coming Back for More"
 "When the Lights Go Out" (US remix)

Personnel
Personnel are lifted from the Five album booklet.
 Richard Stannard – writing, production
 Julian Gallagher – writing, production
 Jason "J" Brown – writing
 Sean Conlon – writing
 Abs Breen – writing
 Matt Sime – mixing, recording

Charts

Weekly charts

Year-end charts

Certifications and sales

References

1998 singles
1998 songs
Five (band) songs
RCA Records singles
Song recordings produced by Richard Stannard (songwriter)
Songs written by Abz Love
Songs written by Jason "J" Brown
Songs written by Julian Gallagher
Songs written by Richard Stannard (songwriter)
Songs written by Sean Conlon